Pogranichny is an urban locality (an urban-type settlement) and the administrative center of Pogranichny District of Primorsky Krai, Russia, located  east of the China–Russia border and  northwest of Vladivostok. Population:

History
In 1898 Orenburg Cossacks from the first  Host district founded the Grodekovo railway station, named after , Governor General  of Priamurye (in office: 1898–1902). The settlement received its present name, "Pogranichny" – which means "border (town)" – in 1958.

Cross-border rail traffic
The railway station in Pogranichny (still called Grodekovo for railway purposes) is the first one east of the Sino-Russian border on the Harbin–Ussuriysk (for Vladivostok) branch of the former Chinese Eastern Railway, the "Trans Manchurian Line". There are currently (December 2013) no through passenger trains between Harbin and Ussuriysk; however, two local trains daily in each direction connect Suifenhe (the last Chinese station on the western side of the border) to Pogranichny. The 27-km journey takes around 1 hour and 25 minutes.

Climate
Pogranichny has a humid continental climate (Köppen climate classification Dwb), with very cold and dry winters and very warm and wet summers.

Notable people
Russian actor Leonid Yarmolnik and Mayor of Barnaul Vladimir Kolganov were born in Grodekovo. Russian poet Arseny Nesmelov died here.

References

Urban-type settlements in Primorsky Krai
China–Russia border crossings